Gluck is a crater on Mercury. It has a diameter of 100 kilometers. Its name was adopted by the International Astronomical Union (IAU) in 1979. Gluck is named for the Austrian composer Christoph Willibald Gluck, who lived from 1714 to 1787.

To the north of Gluck is Echegaray crater.  To the west is Holbein, and to the southeast is Vlaminck.

References

Impact craters on Mercury
Christoph Willibald Gluck